Love Is Here to Stay is a collaborative studio album by American singer Tony Bennett and Canadian singer and pianist Diana Krall. It was released on September 14, 2018, by Verve Records and Columbia Records. The album features the New York-based jazz group the Bill Charlap Trio. An exclusive CD edition containing two bonus tracks was released at Target, while a red-colored opaque vinyl of the album was made available exclusively through Barnes & Noble.

Background
All songs in the album are from the Great American Songbook and were composed by George Gershwin, with lyrics by Ira Gershwin. Bennett first recorded "Fascinating Rhythm" in 1949. By recording the song again for Love Is Here to Stay, he received the Guinness World Records title for "longest time between the release of an original recording and a re-recording of the same single by the same artist." The time span is 68 years and 342 days, according to the Guinness adjudicator who presided over the record-setting. Bennett and Krall have been friends for more than two decades. Krall previously participated in recording two Bennett's albums, Duets: An American Classic (2006) and Playin' with My Friends: Bennett Sings the Blues (2001). This record is their first full-length project together.

Critical reception

Chris Pearson of The Times gave the album four stars out of five, commenting, "Tony Bennett's admirers are by now resigned to him making duet albums, even if he works best solo. This example is more palatable than most since it pairs him with Diana Krall, among the few younger singers to share his deep appreciation of the Great American Songbook. Moreover they are backed by the trio of the pianist Bill Charlap..." John Paul of Spectrum Culture mentioned, "There is nothing on Love Is Here to Stay that will rewrite the legacy of either artist—they've both been better before and Bennett's range isn't quite what it once was (but whose is after some 70 years in the business?) But it's nonetheless an enjoyable pairing of two of the classiest jazz vocalists still working and, more importantly, still clearly enjoying themselves in the process. We should all hope to be so active should we find ourselves becoming nonagenarians".

Stephen Thomas Erlewine of AllMusic stated, "In the Bill Charlap Trio, the pair have empathetic support, keeping the proceedings both light and lush, helping to turn this album into a charming testament to endurance—endurance of the Gershwin catalog, the collaboration between Krall and Bennett, and, especially, how Tony Bennett can still sound completely committed to songs he's spent decades singing". Bobby Reed of DownBeat wrote, "Bennett and Krall offer 10 delightful duets [...] and each vocalist delivers one solo rendition; his is 'Who Cares?' and hers is 'But Not For Me.' Just as salt and pepper can work together in a recipe, Bennett's authoritative vocals and Krall's more delicate delivery complement each other, and several tunes conclude with a delicious bit of unison singing". Lee Mergner of JazzTimes commented, "With the release of Love Is Here to Stay, an exquisite duet album with Diana Krall, Bennett has further cemented his legacy as one of the greatest singers in American music."

Track listing

Personnel
Credits adapted from the liner notes of Love Is Here to Stay.

Musicians
 Tony Bennett – vocals 
 Diana Krall – vocals ; arrangement 
 The Bill Charlap Trio
 Bill Charlap – piano, arrangement 
 Peter Washington – bass 
 Kenny Washington – drums

Technical
 Dae Bennett – production, mixing
 Bill Charlap – production
 Nate Odden – engineering assistance
 Billy Cumella – engineering assistance
 Greg Calbi – mastering

Artwork
 Josh Cheuse – creative direction
 Mark Seliger – photography
 Coco Shinomiya – design

Charts

Weekly charts

Year-end charts

Certifications

References

2018 albums
Albums recorded at Electric Lady Studios
Columbia Records albums
Covers albums
Diana Krall albums
Tony Bennett albums
Verve Records albums
Vocal duet albums
George and Ira Gershwin tribute albums